Pink Lady (also known in Japan as ) is the fourth studio album by Japanese idol duo Pink Lady, released through Victor Entertainment on September 5, 1979, and through Elektra Records as their U.S. debut album on June 1, 1979. It was the duo's first and only English-language album, consisting of three original tracks. The lead single "Kiss in the Dark" Peaked at No. 37 on the Billboard Top 40 and at No. 19 on Oricon's weekly singles chart.

The album peaked at No. 30 on Oricon's weekly albums chart and sold over 17,000 copies. It also reached No. 205 on Billboards "Bubbling Under Top LPs" chart.

Track listing
All music is arranged by John D'Andrea except "Walk Away Renée" by Erich Bulling.

Charts

References

External links
 
 
 

1979 debut albums
Pink Lady (band) albums
English-language Japanese albums
Albums produced by Michael Lloyd (music producer)
Elektra Records albums
Victor Entertainment albums